Events from the year 1941 in Sweden

Incumbents
 Monarch – Gustaf V
 Prime Minister – Per Albin Hansson

Events

 20 January - The first trolleybus line in Stockholm begins to operate.
 4 March - British commandos carry out attacks on Narvik, Norway via Sweden
 25 June - 163rd Infantry Division (Wehrmacht) starts to travel through Sweden.
 17 September- Swedish navy experiences its worst disaster ever in Harsfjarden

Births
 3 February - Monica Nordquist, actress
 13 February - Bo Svenson, actor
 28 April - Ann-Margret, actress
 9 July - Hans-Gunnar Liljenwall, modern pentathlete
 13 September - Jan-Åke Edvinsson, ice hockey administrator (died 2022)

Deaths
 3 January - Henning Ohlson, playwright and screenwriter (b. 1884)
 8 April – Gulli Petrini, women's rights activist (b. 1867)
 3 May – Selma Ek, operatic soprano (b. 1856)
 15 May – Anna Lindhagen, politician (b. 1870)

See also 

 Timeline of Sweden during World War II
 History of Sweden

References

 
Years of the 20th century in Sweden
Sweden